Qassersuaq Peninsula (old spelling: Qagsserssuaq) is a mainland peninsula in northwestern Greenland, located in the south-central part of Upernavik Archipelago.

Geography 
The peninsula is of triangular shape, with the base adjacent to the Greenland ice sheet, south of the Alanngorsuup Sermia glacier. In the northwest, the inner waterways of southern Tasiusaq Bay weakly indent the peninsula with the Nuniaat Bay. In the south, the Qassersuit Saqqaa strait separates the peninsula from a chain of larger islands of the archipelago, bounding Upernavik Icefjord from the northeast: Maniitsoq Island, Puugutaa Island, Sisuarissut Island, and Qaneq Island.

The peninsula is very mountainous, culminating in several glaciated summits. The highest, unnamed peak in the center of the peninsula reaches .

References 

Tasiusaq Bay
Peninsulas of the Upernavik Archipelago